The 1972–73 Houston Aeros season was the Houston Aeros first season of operation in the newly created World Hockey Association (WHA).

Offseason

Regular season

Final standings

Game log

Playoffs

Houston Aeros 4, Los Angeles Sharks 2 - Semifinals

Winnipeg Jets 4, Houston Aeros 0 - Division Finals

Player stats

Note: Pos = Position; GP = Games played; G = Goals; A = Assists; Pts = Points; +/- = plus/minus; PIM = Penalty minutes; PPG = Power-play goals; SHG = Short-handed goals; GWG = Game-winning goals
      MIN = Minutes played; W = Wins; L = Losses; T = Ties; GA = Goals-against; GAA = Goals-against average; SO = Shutouts;

Awards and records

Transactions

Draft picks

See also
1972–73 WHA season

References

External links

Houston
Houston
Houston Aeros seasons